Nola progonia is a moth in the family Nolidae. It was described by George Hampson in 1914. It is found in Kenya.

References

Endemic moths of Kenya
progonia
Moths of Africa
Moths described in 1914